The 1912 United States presidential election in Iowa took place on November 5, 1912, as part of the 1912 United States presidential election. Voters chose 13 representatives, or electors, to the Electoral College, who voted for president and vice president.

Iowa was won by Princeton University President Woodrow Wilson (D–New Jersey), running with governor of Indiana Thomas R. Marshall, with 37.64% of the popular vote, against the 26th president of the United States Theodore Roosevelt (P–New York), running with governor of California Hiram Johnson, with 32.87% of the popular vote and the 27th president of the United States William Howard Taft (R–Ohio), running with Columbia University President Nicholas Murray Butler, with 24.33% of the popular vote.

Wilson was the first Democrat to win Iowa's electoral votes since Franklin Pierce in 1852. No Democrat would obtain a majority until Franklin Roosevelt in 1932.

Results

Results by county

See also
 United States presidential elections in Iowa

Notes

References

Iowa
1912
1912 Iowa elections